The women's 5000 metres event at the 2006 World Junior Championships in Athletics was held in Beijing, China, at Chaoyang Sports Centre on 15 August.

Medalists

Results

Final
15 August

Participation
According to an unofficial count, 13 athletes from 9 countries participated in the event.

References

5000 metres
Long distance running at the World Athletics U20 Championships